Zsanett Borbély (born 9 January 1978 in Szeged) is a former Hungarian handballer.

A former Hungarian international, she participated on the European Championship in 2006, finishing fifth.

Achievements
Nemzeti Bajnokság I:
Winner: 2003, 2004
Magyar Kupa:
Winner: 2004
EHF Champions League:
Semifinalist: 2004
EHF Cup:
Finalist: 2003
Semifinalist: 2002

References

External links
 Career statistics on Worldhandball.com

1978 births
Living people
Sportspeople from Szeged
Hungarian female handball players
Expatriate handball players
Hungarian expatriate sportspeople in Romania
Fehérvár KC players